Cornelia Sulzer (born 4 January 1964) is an Austrian cross-country skier. She competed in three events at the 1988 Winter Olympics.

Cross-country skiing results
All results are sourced from the International Ski Federation (FIS).

Olympic Games

World Championships

World Cup

Season standings

References

1964 births
Living people
Austrian female cross-country skiers
Olympic cross-country skiers of Austria
Cross-country skiers at the 1988 Winter Olympics
People from Liezen District
Sportspeople from Styria
20th-century Austrian women